Count the Days may refer to:

 "Count the Days", song by Kylie Minogue from Rhythm of Love
 "Count the Days", song by The New Power Generation from Exodus
 "I'll Count the Days", song by Rebecca Ferguson
 "Count the Days", a 1996 EP by Citizen King